John Ivlow (born January 26, 1970 in Joliet, Illinois) is a former American football player.  He played college football for Northwestern University and Colorado State University, and appeared as a running back in two games for the Chicago Bears in 1993. Ivlow had also played with the Denver Broncos and San Francisco 49ers. Ivlow went on to win the Super Bowl with the 49ers. Ivlow is now the head football coach of the Bolingbrook High School Raiders. Ivlow and the Raiders went on to win the class 8A state championship in 2011. Ivlow is also a local law enforcement agent in Bolingbrook, Illinois.

Career Record by Year
Year    Head Coach      Record
2017    J. Ivlow        7-4-0 Conference Champions
2016    J. Ivlow        4-5-0
2015    J. Ivlow        5-5-0
2014    J. Ivlow        8-4-0
2013    J. Ivlow        10-1-0  Conference Champions
2012	J. Ivlow	8-3-0		
2011	J. Ivlow	13-1-0	State Champions
2010	J. Ivlow	5-5-0		
2009	J. Ivlow	9-2-0	Conference Champions	
2008	J. Ivlow	10-1-0	Conference Champions	
2007	J. Ivlow	8-3-0	Conference Champions	
2006	J. Ivlow	9-3-0		
2005	J. Ivlow	9-3-0		
2004	J. Ivlow	5-5-0

References

http://www.maxpreps.com/local/team/records/year_by_year_results.aspx?gendersport=boys,football&schoolid=ba3124de-7ecf-4013-b2ab-83f99f50f577

Living people
1970 births
Northwestern Wildcats football players
Colorado State Rams football players
Chicago Bears players